Mario's Pizzeria is a pizza restaurant chain in Trinidad and Tobago.

Mario's started operations in June 1972 at the Valpark Shopping Plaza and has grown to twenty two restaurants in Trinidad, plus five stores in Guyana. The chain is owned and operated by Richard Harford, one of the founding partners.

External links 
 Official Website

Pizza chains
Restaurants established in 1972
Restaurants in Trinidad and Tobago
1972 establishments in Trinidad and Tobago